El Rancagüino is a Chilean newspaper, based on Rancagua. It was founded on 16 August 1915 under the name of La Semana ("The Week"). It is distributed in the thirty-three communes of O'Higgins Region. The newspaper is member of the National Press Association, and an active member of the Inter-American Press Society.

References

External links
 El Rancagüino 

Newspapers published in Chile
Publications established in 1915
Mass media in Rancagua